Clint Aaron Davies (born 24 April 1983) is a professional footballer who plays as a goalkeeper. He played in the Football League for Bradford City.

References

External links

1983 births
Living people
Australian soccer players
Australian expatriate soccer players
Association football goalkeepers
English Football League players
Birmingham City F.C. players
Tamworth F.C. players
Nuneaton Borough F.C. players
Woking F.C. players
Bradford City A.F.C. players
Halifax Town A.F.C. players